Taha Abdelmagid (born 8 June 1987) is a powerlifter from Egypt. At the 2012 Summer Paralympics he won a bronze medal in the men's 48 kg powerlifting event, lifting .

He won the bronze medal in the men's 54 kg event at the 2021 World Para Powerlifting Championships held in Tbilisi, Georgia.

References

External links 
 

Paralympic bronze medalists for Egypt
Powerlifters at the 2012 Summer Paralympics
1987 births
Living people
Medalists at the 2012 Summer Paralympics
African Games bronze medalists for Egypt
African Games medalists in weightlifting
Competitors at the 2015 African Games
Paralympic medalists in powerlifting
Paralympic powerlifters of Egypt
21st-century Egyptian people